The  Reliance  is a Chesapeake Bay skipjack, built in 1904 at Fishing Creek, Maryland. She is a  two-sail bateau, or "V"-bottomed deadrise type of centerboard sloop. She one of the 35 surviving traditional Chesapeake Bay skipjacks and a member of the last commercial sailing fleet in the United States. She is located at Tilghman, Talbot County, Maryland.

She was listed on the National Register of Historic Places in 1976.

References

External links
, including photo in 1975, at Maryland Historical Trust

Ships in Talbot County, Maryland
Skipjacks
Ships on the National Register of Historic Places in Maryland
1904 ships
National Register of Historic Places in Talbot County, Maryland